Welling is an unincorporated community and census-designated place (CDP) in Cherokee County, Oklahoma, United States. The population was 771 at the 2010 census, an increase of 15.25 percent over the figure of 669 recorded in 2000. It is home to The Salvation Army's Heart o' Hills camp and conference center.

Geography
Welling is located in eastern Cherokee County approximately four miles southeast of Tahlequah. The Illinois River flows past two miles to the west and the north end of  Tenkiller Ferry Lake is three miles south.

Demographics

As of the census of 2000, there were 669 people, 247 households, and 187 families residing in the CDP. The population density was 22.6 people per square mile (8.7/km2). There were 306 housing units at an average density of 10.3/sq mi (4.0/km2). The racial makeup of the CDP was 53.36% White, 38.57% Native American, 0.15% Asian, and 7.92% from two or more races. Hispanic or Latino of any race were 2.69% of the population.

There were 247 households, out of which 39.7% had children under the age of 18 living with them, 61.9% were married couples living together, 9.7% had a female householder with no husband present, and 23.9% were non-families. 21.1% of all households were made up of individuals, and 7.3% had someone living alone who was 65 years of age or older. The average household size was 2.71 and the average family size was 3.13.

In the CDP, the population was spread out, with 29.4% under the age of 18, 11.2% from 18 to 24, 25.9% from 25 to 44, 23.3% from 45 to 64, and 10.2% who were 65 years of age or older. The median age was 33 years. For every 100 females, there were 96.8 males. For every 100 females age 18 and over, there were 102.6 males.

The median income for a household in the CDP was $24,118, and the median income for a family was $28,500. Males had a median income of $25,938 versus $19,375 for females. The per capita income for the CDP was $16,859. About 21.7% of families and 27.8% of the population were below the poverty line, including 34.8% of those under age 18 and 26.5% of those age 65 or over.

References

Census-designated places in Cherokee County, Oklahoma
Census-designated places in Oklahoma